Lesser duckweed is a common name for several plants and may refer to:

Lemna aequinoctialis
Lemna minor, also common duckweed